Biryusa Krasnoyarsk are a Russian ice hockey team in the Zhenskaya Hockey League (ZhHL). They play in Krasnoyarsk, the capital of Krasnoyarsk Krai in Siberia, at the Platinum Arena Krasnoyarsk and use Fakel Ice Palace as a secondary arena. The team was founded in 1987 as Lokomotiv Krasnoyarsk and was called Lokomotiv-Energiya Krasnoyarsk during 2008 to 2012.

Since 2012, Biryusa have been a part of the Hockey Club Sokol, which also operates Sokol Krasnoyarsk of the Supreme Hockey League (VHL) and the Krasnoyarskie Rysi of the Supreme Hockey League Championship (VHL-B).

History

Lokomotiv 
In 1987, the Lokomotiv women's team was established as a bandy team. The founders of the team were the Krasnoyarsk Railway Administration and the Road
Territorial Organization of the Trade Union of the Krasnoyarsk Railway (DORPROFSOZh). Valery Pozdnyakov became the head coach of the team. Beginning in 1987, the team participated in the Bandy Championship of the Soviet Union (USSR), the Commonwealth of Independent States (CIS), and Russia. In 1991, they were silver medalists of the USSR Championship and in 1992 they won the USSR Champion title. Lokomotiv's players were consistently selected to the national bandy team of the Soviet Union and, following the dissolution of the Soviet Union, the national bandy team of Russia.

In 1994, the International Olympic Committee (IOC) selected to include women's ice hockey in the Winter Olympic program beginning at the 1998 Winter Olympics. The team was reoriented towards ice hockey at the initiative of the Krasnoyarsk Regional Committee on Physical Culture and Sports, and were a founding team of the Russian Women’s Hockey League in 1995.

Lokomotiv-Energiya 
In 2008, after being accepted into its ranks as an affiliate club of HC Energiya in Neryungri, the name of the club changed to Lokomotiv-Energiya. On 1 June 2011, Lokomotiv-Energiya joined the Sokol hockey club organization. In March 2012, the team relocated to the new Pervomaisky Ice Arena in the Leninsky district of Krasnoyarsk.

Biryusa 
In August 2012, after the contracts with Russian Railways and HC Energiya Neryungri expired, it was decided to rename the team. After a survey of fans and the team administration, the women's team of Krasnoyarsk was renamed "Biryusa," after the river Biryusa. At the end of 2012 the team returned to the rebuilt Sokol Ice Palace for training and home games.

In the 2015–16 season, Biryusa was a founding team of the Zhenskaya Hockey League (ZhHL), joining SKIF Nizhny Novgorod as the only teams to have participated in the inaugural season of both the Russian Women’s Hockey League and the ZhHL.

Season-by-season results 
This list includes all Zhenskaya Hockey League seasons completed by Biryusa since the league was established in 2015.Note: Finish = Rank at end of regular season; GP = Games played, W = Wins (3 points), OTW = Overtime wins (2 points), OTL = Overtime losses (1 point), L = Losses, GF = Goals for, GA = Goals against, Pts = Points, Top scorer: Points (Goals+Assists)

Players and personnel

2021–22 roster 

Coaching staff and team personnel
 Head coach: Alexander Vedernikov
 Assistant coach: Valery Tripuzov
 Goaltending coach: Ilya Protsenko
 Team manager: Nikolai Matsuev
 Team doctor: Liliya Sergeyeva

Team captaincy history 
 Oksana Tretyakova, –2017
 Valeria Pavlova, 2017–present

Head coaches 
 Valery Pozdnyakov, 1987–
 Alexander Lubyagin, –2004
 Alexander Vedernikov, 2015–present

Awards and honours

Russian Ice Hockey Championship 
  Third Place (10): 1995–96, 1996–97, 1998–99, 1999–2000, 2000–01, 2002–03, 2008–09, 2015–16, 2018–19, 2019–20

Other 
   International Ice Hockey Tournament at Cergy-Pontoise (1): 1998 
 USSR Bandy Championship Runner-up (1): 1990–91
  USSR Bandy Cup Champion (1): 1990–91

Player awards 

 ZhHL Forward of the Year (Top goal scorer)
 2019–20: Valeria Pavlova

ZhHL All-Stars 
 
2018 Astana: Yekaterina Dobrodeyeva (F), Yekaterina Lobova (D), Lydia Malyavko (F), Nadezhda Morozova (G)
 2019 Nizhnekamsk: Pavlína Horálková (D), Nadezhda Morozova (G), Anna Timofeyeva (F), Valeria Pavlova (F)
 2020 Moscow: Yekaterina Dobrodeyeva (F), Pavlína Horálková (D), Valeria Pavlova (F)

ZhHL Player of the Month
 Forward of the Month
 September 2021: Valeria Pavlova

Franchise records 
Note: In order to present accurate statistics, only records from the Zhenskaya Hockey League are included for single-season and career records., from the inaugural ZhHL season in 2015–16 through the 2020–21 ZhHL season,

Single-season records
Regular season
 Most goals in a season: Valeria Pavlova, 33 goals (35 games; 2018–19)
 Most assists in a season: Valeria Pavlova, 23 assists (27 games; 2019–20)
 Most points in a season: Valeria Pavlova, 50 points (35 games; 2018–19)
 Most points in a season, defenceman: Yekaterina Lobova, 21 goals (games; 2016–17)

 Most penalty minutes in a season: Tatyana Shatalova, 47 PIM (23 games; 2017–18)
 Best save percentage in a season, over ten games played: Darya Gredzen, .922 SVS% (21 games; 2020–21)
 Best goals against average in a season, over ten games played: Nadezhda Morozova, 2.26 GAA (35 games; 2018–19)
Source: Elite Prospects

Career records 
Regular season
Most career goals: Valeria Pavlova, 121 goals (138 games; 2015–2021)
Most career assists: Valeria Pavlova, 83 assists (138 games; 2015–2021)
Most career points: Valeria Pavlova, 00 points (138 games; 2015–2021)
Best career points per game, over 30 games played: Valeria Pavlova, 1.478 points per game (138 games; 2015–2021)
Most career points, defenceman: Pavlína Horálková, 65 points (165 games; 2015–2021)
Most career penalty minutes: Tatyana Shatalova, 105 PIM (109 games; 2015–2019)
Most career games played, goaltender: Nadezhda Morozova, 135 games (2015–2020)

Source: Elite Prospects

All-time scoring leaders
The top-ten point-scorers in franchise history, from the 1995–96 RWHL season through the 2020–21 ZhHL season.

Note: Nat = Nationality; Pos = Position; GP = Games played; G = Goals; A = Assists; Pts = Points; P/G = Points per game;  = 2021–22 Biryusa player; Italics indicate totals compiled from incomplete statistics

Notable alumni 
Years active with Biryusa listed alongside player name.
Tatiana Burina, 1996–
Yekaterina Lobova, 2015–2019 & 2020–21
Tatyana Shatalova, 2015–2019
Kristina Sherstyuk, –2015
Anna Timofeyeva, 2018–2021
Oksana Tretyakova, 1996–
Olga Volkova, 1996–

International players
  Lidiya Malyavko, 2015–2019
 Lucie Manhartová, 2014–15
  Klára Peslarová, 2014–15
  Mariya Skvortsova, 2003–04
  Natalya Stus, –
  Natalya Trunova, 1996–97

References

External links 
 Team information and statistics from EliteProspects.com or Eurohockey.com or Hockeyarchives.info

 
Ice hockey teams in Russia
Defunct bandy clubs
Zhenskaya Hockey League teams